Kvisla may refer to the following locations:

Kvisla in Hol municipality, Buskerud
Kvisla in Engerdal municipality, Hedmark